Towards the Sun may refer to:

 Towards the Sun (film), a 1955 documentary film directed by Andrzej Wajda
 Towards the Sun (album), a 2011 album by Alexi Murdoch
 "Towards the Sun" (song), a 2015 song by Rihanna